3er arco (3rd arch) is the third album by Argentine rock band Los Piojos. Recorded and mixed between June and July in 1996 at Del Cielito Records. It was officially presented at the Arpegios Theatre. Two concerts at the Estadio Obras in September, two concerts at the Microestadio de Ferro in November and three more concerts at the Estadio Obras in December.

It is included in "The 100 best argentine rock albums" as listed on the Rolling Stone magazine.

Reception
The Allmusic review by Stephen Thomas Erlewine awarded the album 4 stars stating "3er Arco finds the Argentinean band Los Piojos -- composed of Daniel "Piti" Fernandez, Daniel Buira, Miguel Angel "Micky" Rodriguez, Gustavo Kupinski and Andres Ciro Martinez—at the peak of their form, turning out an imaginative fusion of Latin rhythms and hard rock. It's their finest moment to date and the best way to become acquainted with the band. ".

Track listing 
 "Esquina Libertad" [Libertad corner] – 4:37
 "Taxi boy" [Rent boy] – 4:05
 "El farolito" [Little Streetlamp] – 4:13
 "Shup – Shup"  – 3:26
 "Al atardecer" [At dusk] – 4:43
 "Qué decís" [What do you say] – 4:21
 "Don't Say Tomorrow"  – 3:37
 "Todo pasa" [Everything happens] – 5:33
 "Intro Maradó" [Maradó intro] – 0:46
 "Maradó" [Maradó] – 3:58
 "Gris" [Grey] – 5:05
 "Muevelo" [Move it] – 4:16
 "Verano del '92" [Summer of '92] – 4:41

Personnel 

Adrián Bilbao – engineer, mixing
Alejandro Brittes – accordion
Dani Buira – drums, percussion, backing vocals
Daniel Fernández – guitar, backing vocals
Gustavo H. Kupinski – guitar
Andrés Ciro Martínez – guitar, harmonica, vocals, backing vocals
Andrés Mayo – mastering
Guillermina Montello – photography
Martin Pomares – assistant engineer
Micki Rodriguez – photography
Miguel A. Rodriguez – bass, backing vocals
Alfredo Toth – producer, backing vocals

External links 
 3er arco

References 

1996 albums
Los Piojos albums